Fikri Sağlar (born 1953) is a Turkish social democrat politician. He was Minister of Culture in the early 1990s, and a member of the parliamentary commission which investigated the Susurluk scandal. He has been a columnist for Birgün.

In 1983 he was elected deputy chairman of the Social Democratic Populist Party (SHP). The SHP merged with the Republican People's Party (CHP) in the 1990s. Sağlar was a minister both in the 50th and in the 52nd government of Turkey. In 2001 Sağlar resigned from the CHP along with several others, having been referred to a disciplinary board (which cleared him) for allegedly working against the CHP's interests. He co-founded the new Social Democratic People's Party in 2002, becoming its Secretary-General. In 2002 he was charged, along with some others, with insulting the government, due to some comments in a television discussion programme.

He is the author of two books, Code Name Susurluk and Contemporary Culture from National to the Global.

References 

1953 births
Living people
People from Mut, Mersin
Social Democratic Populist Party (Turkey) politicians
Contemporary Republican People's Party (Turkey) politicians
Social Democratic People's Party (Turkey) politicians
Members of the Grand National Assembly of Turkey
Members of the 49th government of Turkey
Members of the 50th government of Turkey
Members of the 52nd government of Turkey
Members of the 26th Parliament of Turkey
Ministers of State of Turkey